The Coalport branch line was a standard gauge London and North Western Railway branch line in Shropshire, England, which ran between Hadley Junction near Oakengates on the Stafford to Shrewsbury line and a terminus at Coalport East railway station on the north bank of the River Severn at Coalport.

Commercial history
The  branch line opened on 17 June 1861.  Passenger services were little used, with the line's existence being mainly supported by freight traffic.  There were sidings at locations including Blists Hill Ironworks and the Coalport China factory of John Rose and Co.

The line was closed to passengers in 1952 and to regular freight on 5 December 1960, the line to Stirchley finally closed to even sporadic traffic on 6 July 1964.

Preservation
On 9 April 1980 the  gauge Telford Town Tramway was opened by the Reverend W. Awdry on the trackbed of the Coalport branch alongside Randlay Pool in Telford Town Park. The tramway only lasted a few years before it closed in the mid-1980s. The tram has since been preserved by the Telford Steam Railway running on its own circular track by Horsehay Pool.

The interchange siding at Blists Hill now forms part of the Ironbridge Gorge Museum Trust’s Blists Hill Victorian Town site.

Four miles of the former trackbed now form part of the Silkin Way, a cycling and walking route managed by Telford and Wrekin Council. It runs south of the former Malins Lee railway station to just north of the former Coalport East railway station.

References

External links
 and  Geograph 1963 photos of Coalport East
Geograph 1964 photo
Geograph photo of Madeley Market Station
Madeley local history with photo
LNWR Society history

Closed railway lines in the West Midlands (region)
Rail transport in Shropshire
London and North Western Railway
Railway lines opened in 1861
Railway lines closed in 1964
1861 establishments in England
1964 disestablishments in England